Discount Drug Mart, Inc., is a northeast Ohio based drug store chain. Its first store opened in Elyria, Ohio in 1969 by Parviz Boodjeh, RPh.

History 

In 1969, Parviz Boodjeh established the first Discount Drug Mart in Elyria, Ohio. The store originally filled prescriptions, and sold toiletries, grocery, and gift items.

In the early 1980s, Boodjeh began standardizing the merchandise offerings and commissioned an architect to develop a store design on which all Discount Drug stores would be based.

Discount Drug Mart expanded across Ohio through the 1990s.

In August 2015, MetroHealth partnered with Discount Drug Mart and opened its first primary care clinic in a Discount Drug Mart location.

In January 2020, the company announced the expansion of its partnership with the MetroHealth System, adding more clinics to its stores across Ohio.

References

Pharmacies of the United States
Health care companies based in Ohio
American companies established in 1969
Retail companies established in 1969
Elyria, Ohio
Medina, Ohio